CP5 may refer to:

CP5 (classification), a disability sport classification specific to cerebral palsy
 CP5, a Network Rail Control Period (2014–2019) of railway infrastructure in Great Britain
 CP5, an EEG electrode site in the 10-20 system